The 1988 United States presidential election in Michigan took place on November 8, 1988. All 50 states and the District of Columbia, were part of the 1988 United States presidential election. Voters chose 20 electors to the Electoral College, which selected the president and vice president.

Michigan was won by incumbent United States Vice President George H. W. Bush of Texas, who was running against Massachusetts Governor Michael Dukakis. Bush ran with Indiana Senator Dan Quayle as Vice President, and Dukakis ran with Texas Senator Lloyd Bentsen.

Michigan weighed in for this election as 0.1% more Republican than the national average. This election marks the last time a Republican carried Michigan with a majority of the vote. It was the last time a Republican presidential candidate won the state until Donald Trump's plurality win in 2016.

Typical for elections in the 1980s, the Upper Peninsula of Michigan turned out mainly Democratic, and the Lower Peninsula turned out mainly Republican, with the notable exception of Detroit's highly populated Wayne County, which voted mainly Democratic. , this is the last election in which Ingham County, Kalamazoo County, and Muskegon County voted for a Republican Presidential candidate. As of the 2020 U.S. presidential election, this is also the last time Michigan voted to the right of neighboring Wisconsin, as well as the last time the Lower Peninsula voted for the Republican presidential candidate.

The presidential election of 1988 was a very partisan election for Michigan, with more than 99% of the electorate voting for either the Democratic or Republican parties. Bush won the election in Michigan with a solid 7.90% point margin. The election of 1988 was, however, the final election where Michigan was won by the Republican Party until 2016, having consistently voted Democratic since 1992. Bush's victory in this rapidly liberalizing state is reflective of a nationwide reconsolidation of base for the Republican Party, which took place through the 1980s. Through the passage of some economic programs, spearheaded by then President Ronald Reagan (called, collectively, "Reaganomics"), the mid-to-late 1980s saw a period of economic growth and stability. The hallmark of Reaganomics was partly the wide-scale deregulation of corporate interests and large-scale tax cuts. Dukakis ran on a socially liberal platform, and advocated for higher economic regulation and environmental protection. Bush, alternatively, ran on a campaign of continuing the social and economic policies of former President Reagan - which gained him much support with social conservatives and people living in rural areas.

Results

Results by county

See also
 Presidency of George H. W. Bush
 United States presidential elections in Michigan

References

Michigan
1988
1988 Michigan elections